KUAM-FM, (93.9 FM) branded as Breeze 93.9 is a radio station broadcasting from the village of Dededo in the United States territory of Guam. The station broadcasts an adult contemporary music format.

The station is owned by Pacific Telestations, LLC (a company of the local conglomerate Calvo Enterprises, Inc.) and is the sister station to KUAM-TV and KUAM-LP. It is also Guam's first FM station, having signed on the air on September 1, 1966, known as FM94 and 94 Rock. In the 1990s they were known as 94 Jamz, "The People's Station".

In early 2000s the station's moniker became i94, "Guam's Favorite".

On July 23, 2020, it was announced that KUAM would flip to AC (adult contemporary) format as Breeze 93.9 on July 27.

References

External links
KUAM Stations' website
i94 FM at MySpace
Malafunkshun (Morning Show hosts) at MySpace

Mainstream adult contemporary radio stations in the United States
UAM-FM
Radio stations established in 1966
1966 establishments in Guam
Agana Heights, Guam
Adult contemporary radio stations in insular areas of the United States